U.S. Highway 159 (US 159) is a  auxiliary route of US 59. It travels from Nortonville, Kansas at US 59 to New Point, Missouri, also at US 59. The highway permits through traffic on US 59 to bypass the cities of Atchison, Kansas and Saint Joseph, Missouri, traveling instead through Falls City, Nebraska and Hiawatha, Kansas (assuming the bridge over the Missouri River is open).

Route description

Kansas
The southwestern end of U.S. Route 159 is in Nortonville, Kansas. It joins with U.S. Route 73 in Horton, Kansas. The two highways overlap and passing through Hiawatha, Kansas and Reserve, Kansas, stretching to the Nebraska border.  The highway provides an important connection between Falls City, Nebraska and Hiawatha, Kansas, providing Nebraska residents with an alternative connection to St. Joseph, Missouri when there is a problem with the Rulo bridge.

Nebraska 
U.S. Route 159 enters Nebraska through its southern border in Richardson County. It enters south of Falls City, Nebraska concurrently with U.S. Route 73. After coming up through the south end of Falls City, the U.S. Route 159 turns east (with Route 73 continuing north).  After the eastbound turn, U.S. Route leaves the state at the Missouri River bridge in Rulo, Nebraska.

Missouri
U.S. Route 159 enters the state of Missouri crossing the Missouri River near the Rulo bridge south of Big Lake, Missouri. It crosses Interstate 29 near Fortescue, Missouri before ending at US-59 near New Point.

History
When the route was commissioned in 1934, U.S. Route 159 only went between Nortonville, Kansas and Horton, Kansas.  In 1945, it was extended north to Craig, Missouri via Falls City, Nebraska.  After 1975, the route in Missouri was altered to go east from the Fortescue area to what is now its current terminus near New Point, Missouri.  The old route which went to Craig is now Route 111.

In 2013, a new bridge over the Missouri River, located about 650 feet south of the old Rulo Bridge, opened to traffic. In April 2019, a large portion of this route was closed for several months because of flooding of the Missouri River. The bridge and the road between Rulo, Nebraska and Missouri Route 111 was reopened in September 2019, and the remainder of the route to Interstate 29 was reopened in late October.

Major intersections

See also
 U.S. Route 59
 U.S. Route 259

Notes

References

External links

 Endpoints of U.S. Highway 159

 
United States Numbered Highway System
U.S. Highways in Kansas
U.S. Highways in Nebraska
U.S. Highways in Missouri
1
U.S. Route 159
U.S. Route 159
U.S. Route 159
U.S. Route 159
U.S. Route 159